Disney Sing It is a karaoke video game. It was released on October 28, 2008 for the PlayStation 2, PlayStation 3, Wii, Xbox 360 and Microsoft Windows.

It's the second game in the Disney Sing It series after High School Musical: Sing It!. The game features 35 songs from Disney-affiliated artists and Disney Channel productions like Hannah Montana, Camp Rock, Aly & AJ, Miley Cyrus and the Jonas Brothers. It also features a selection of songs from the High School Musical franchise and a "Singing lessons" mode with Olesya Rulin as a vocal coach.

The game has received mixed reviews, with both 1UP.com and IGN praising its accessibility towards kids but finding serious fault with the gameplay, with Official Xbox Magazine ultimately calling it a "gateway game" at best.

It was followed by a third game, Disney Sing It! – High School Musical 3: Senior Year.

See also
High School Musical: Sing It!
Disney Sing It! – High School Musical 3: Senior Year
Disney Sing It: Pop Hits
Disney Sing It: Party Hits
Disney Sing It: Family Hits

References

External links
 Official mini-site
 IGN
 Gear Live

2008 video games
Disney video games
Sing It!
Karaoke video games
Multiplayer and single-player video games
PlayStation 2 games
PlayStation 3 games
Video games developed in the United Kingdom
Wii games
Windows games
Xbox 360 games
Zoë Mode games